A rocking chair or rocker is a type of chair with two curved bands (also known as rockers) attached to the bottom of the legs, connecting the legs on each side to each other.  The rockers contact the floor at only two points, giving the occupant the ability to rock back and forth by shifting their weight or pushing lightly with their feet. Rocking chairs are most commonly made of wood. Some rocking chairs can fold.

Etymology
The word rocking chair comes from the verb to rock. The first known use of the term rocking chair was in 1766.

Purpose

Rocking chairs are often seen as evocative of parenting, as the gentle rocking motion soothes infants and sends them off to sleep.

Many adults find rocking chairs soothing because of the gentle motion. Gentle rocking motion has been shown to provide faster onset of sleep than remaining stationary, mimicking the process of a parent rocking a child to sleep.

Rocking chairs are also comfortable because, when a user sits in one without rocking, the chair automatically rocks backward until the sitter's center of gravity is met, thus granting an ergonomic benefit with the occupant kept at an un-stressed position and angle.

Varieties of rockers include those mounted on a spring base (or platform) called "platform rockers" and those with swinging braces commonly known as gliders.

History

Though American inventor Benjamin Franklin is sometimes credited with inventing the rocking chair, historians actually trace the rocking chair's origins to North America during the early 18th century, when Franklin was a child. Originally used in gardens, they were simply ordinary chairs with rockers attached. It was in 1725 that early rocking chairs first appeared in England. The production of wicker rocking chairs reached its peak in America during the middle of the 18th century. These wicker rockers, as they were popularly known, were famous for their craftsmanship and creative designs. Rocking cradles long predate rocking chairs however and an example exists from antiquity, found in the ruins of Herculaneum.

During the 1830's Peter Cooper American industrialist and inventor designed the first steel chair in America which was a rocking chair, and exhibited at Crystal Palace Exhibition in 1851.

Michael Thonet, a German craftsman, created the first bentwood rocking chair in 1860. This design is distinguished by its graceful shape and its light weight. These rocking chairs were influenced by Greek and Roman designs as well as Renaissance and colonial era artistry.

During the 1920s, however, folding rocking chairs became more popular in the United States and in Europe. They were handy for outdoor activities and travel purposes. By the 1950s, rocking chairs built by Sam Maloof, an American craftsman, became famous for their durability and deluxe appearance. Maloof's rocking chairs are distinguished by their ski-shaped rockers.

Types of Rocking Chair

Peter Cooper 
Peter Cooper American industrialist and inventor designed an iron-frame chair with a functional, minimalist design radically different from Victorian heavily decorated, ostentatious designs. At that time most rocking chairs had separate rockers fixed to regular chair legs, Cooper's chair used the curve of its frame to ensure the rocking motion. Coopers chair was made of steel or wrought iron with upholstery slung across the frame. Cooper's modell was manufactured at R.W. Winfield & Co. in Britain. The firm exhibited examples of the chair at the Great Exhibition of the Works of Industry of all Nations (Crystal Palace Exhibition) in 1851 and the Great London Exposition of 1862.

Bentwood
Michael Thonet received a patent in 1856 for the process of bentwood manufacturing, when he and his five sons began to produce innovative ‘bentwood’ furniture. Rare Antique Thonet Bentwood Rocking Chair Figural Carved and Pressed Wood with Griffins and Northwind Face. Item features figural pressed wood back and seat with griffin and northwind face.

Boston
Actually made in Connecticut, Boston rockers were traditionally made of oak and pine, painted black, and embellished with fruit and flower designs.

Folding
Folding rocking chairs were popular starting in the 1870s. They come in a variety of styles, but are recognized by backs designed to fold down to the seat.

Wicker
Wicker rocking chairs were machine-manufactured rocker armchairs from the early 20th century. These were usually part of a sun parlor set, which included a sofa, side chairs, a table, a planter, and a floor lamp.

Pressed Back
The pressed back rocking chair was part of the American colony revival style that lasted from about 1870-1920. You can easily identify this style by the raised design of the wood on the back.

Ladder Back
The ladder back rocking chair is what many people think of when they think of a country rocking chair. It is easily recognized from its tall back and horizontal slat design.

The 'Kennedy Rocker' rocking chair
President John F. Kennedy made the P & P Chair's rocking chair famous. In 1955, Kennedy, who suffered from chronic back problems, was prescribed swimming and the use of a rocking chair by his physician. The President so enjoyed the rocker that, after he was inaugurated in 1961, he took the chair on Air Force One when he traveled around the country and the world. He bought additional rockers for Camp David and for the Kennedy estates; and he gave them as gifts to friends, family, and heads of state. Kennedy's rocking chair from the White House is on permanent display at the John F. Kennedy Library and Museum.

Per the manufacturing design, the Kennedy Rocking Chair is shaped, steam-bent, and assembled while the wood is still green.

See also
Bassinet, another rocking piece of furniture
Glider (furniture), a chair that rocks via suspension from a four-bar linkage
"Rockin' Chair" (song) by Hoagy Carmichael
Swing (seat), the rocking movement comes from suspension

References

External links
Pictorial history of rocking chairs

Chairs